WTHG (104.7 FM) is a radio station licensed to Hinesville, Georgia. The station shifted from a variety hits "Freedom" format to a classic hits format known as "104.7 The Hawk" in late-April 2006. In December 2008, the format changed to an adult contemporary format with the slogan "The Greatest Hits of the 1960s, '70s, '80s and Today".

Previous formats include adult hits as "Freedom 104.7" (this format moved to 92.3/WSGA), sports talk as "104.7 The Fan" and urban contemporary as "Phat 104.7". The station had the WHVL calls from 1992 to 2002.

On March 13, 2009, Tama Broadcasting sold WTHG to WRGO-FM Radio, LLC, doing business as Savannah Radio. This is WRGO-FM Radio, LLC's first foray into the Savannah market.

External links

Sports radio stations in the United States
THG